Sveti Stefan is a village in the municipality of Ohrid, North Macedonia. It is a beachside town along Lake Ohrid, located south of the city of Ohrid.

Demographics
According to the 2002 census, the village had a total of 112 inhabitants. Ethnic groups in the village include:

Macedonians 111
Others 1

References

Villages in Ohrid Municipality